In Ukraine, the Word of the Year  poll is carried out since 2013 by Myslovo online user-generated dictionary of Ukrainian slang and neologisms.

Winners
2013: «Євромайдан» — «Euromaidan». The word also took the second place in the Russian Word of the year poll.
2014: «кіборги» — "cyborgs" (a moniker for Ukrainian military defending Donetsk Airport).
2015: «блокада» — blockade (because of blockade of Russian-annexed Crimea).
2016: «корупція» — corruption (emphasizing the damaging effect it has on Ukrainian state).
2017: «безвіз» — "bezviz" (a neologism meaning the visa-free regime between Ukraine and the European Union. "bez viz" literally means "without visas").
2018: «томос» — tomos (in reference of the recognition of the autocephaly of the Orthodox Church of Ukraine).

References

External links
 Myslovo dictionary website

Ukrainian language
Ukraine